

The Mitel Superset Series of Office Telephones

The Mitel Superset 4DN Telephone 
The Superset 4DN was one of the first Digital Telephones made by Mitel and was announced in October 1986.

Mitel Superset 400 Series 
The 400 range consisted of a 401+,410,420 and 430 See 
The telephones connected back to the Mitel exchange digitally using 1 pair of cables.
A Mitel MT8971BP IC was used in this range of handsets to communicate with a port on the DNIC card in a SX 50, SX 200 or SX 2000 Mitel switch

All in this range apart from the 401+ were loud speaking telephones, allowing the user to converse fully hands free.

Mitel Superset 4000 Series 

The 4000 series supersedes the 400 series and consists of the 4001,4015,4125 and 4150

The Superset 4001 has no LCD display and has similar functionality to the 401+
The 4001 has 4 main Ic's - A Motorola SC427602FN With 93C46B,MT9196AP,MT9171AP and a MC33362 PSU IC

Telephony equipment

References